This list of the prehistoric life of Illinois contains the various prehistoric life-forms whose fossilized remains have been reported from within the US state of Illinois.

Precambrian
The Paleobiology Database records no known occurrences of Precambrian fossils in Illinois.

Paleozoic

Selected Paleozoic taxa of Illinois

 †Achatella
 †Actinoceras
  †Alethopteris
 †Alethopteris decurrens
 †Alethopteris lonchitica
 †Alethopteris owenii
 †Alethopteris serlii
  †Amphibamus – type locality for genus
 †Amphibamus grandiceps – type locality for species
 †Amphiscapha
 †Amynilyspes – type locality for genus
 †Annularia
 †Annularia asteris – or unidentified comparable form
 †Annularia stellata
 †Anomphalus – type locality for genus
 †Anthracoceras
 †Archaeocidaris – tentative report
 †Archaeopteris
  †Archimedes
 †Archimedes communis
 †Archimedes compactus
 †Archimedes invaginatus
 †Archimedes lativolvis
 †Archimedes macfarlani
 †Archimedes swallovanus
 †Archimedes terebriformis
 †Archimylacris
 †Arctinurus
  †Arthrolycosa – type locality for genus
 †Artisia
 †Asterotheca
 †Asterotheca miltoni – or unidentified comparable form
 †Asyncritus – type locality for genus
 †Athyris
 †Atrypa
 †Atrypa reticularis – report made of unidentified related form or using admittedly obsolete nomenclature
 †Aviculopecten
 †Aviculopecten fasciculatus
 † Avonia
 †Bandringa – type locality for genus
 †Bassleroceras
 †Bellerophon
 †Bellerophon spergensis
 †Belinurus
 †Bembexia
 †Blattoidea
  †Brachydectes
 †Brachydectes newberryi
  †Bumastus
 †Bumastus armatus – or unidentified comparable form
 †Bumastus chicagoensis
 †Bumastus cuniculus – or unidentified comparable form
 †Bumastus graftonensis
 †Bumastus insignis
 †Bumastus springfieldensis
 †Bumastus transversalis
 †Calamites
 †Calamites suckowii
 †Callipteridium
 †Calvinia
 †Calymene
 †Calymene breviceps
 †Calymene celebra
 †Calyptaulax
 †Camarotoechia
  †Caseodus
 †Cephalerpeton – type locality for genus
 †Cephalerpeton ventriarmatum – type locality for species
 †Ceratiocaris
 †Ceratocephala
 †Ceraurinella
 †Ceraurinus
  †Ceraurus
 †Cheirurus
 †Chonetes
 †Chonetes ornatus
 †Cleiothyridina
 †Cleiothyridina atrypoides
 †Cleiothyridina sublamellosa
 †Clepsydrops – type locality for genus
 †Cliftonia
  †Coelacanthus
 †Composita
 †Composita subtilita
 †Composita trinuclea
 †Conocardium
 †Cooperoceras
 †Cordaicarpus
 †Cordaites
 †Cordaites principalis
 †Cornulites
 †Crania
 †Craniops
  †Cricotus – type locality for genus
 †Crotalocrinites
 †Ctenacanthus
 †Ctenacanthus buttersi – type locality for species
 †Curriella – tentative report
 †Cyathocrinites
 †Cyclonema
 †Cyclus
 †Cyphaspis
 †Cyrtoceras
 †Dalmanites
  †Deiphon
 †Dicoelosia
 †Dictyonema
 †Dimerocrinites
 †Dimerocrinites occidentalis
  †Diplocaulus – type locality for genus
 †Domatoceras
 †Echinaria
  †Edestus
 †Edmondia
 †Elonichthys
 †Encrinurus
 †Eodictyonella
 †Eophacops
 †Eophacops handwerki
 †Eospirifer
 †Eospirifer radiatus
 †Erratencrinurus
  †Eucalyptocrinites
 †Eucalyptocrinites crassus
 †Euomphalus
 †Euomphalus planodorsatus
  †Euphoberia – type locality for genus
 †Euphoberia armigera – type locality for species
 †Favosites
 †Fenestella
 †Fletcheria
 †Gerarus – type locality for genus
  †Glikmanius
 †Glikmanius occidentalis
 †Glyptambon
 †Glyptopleura
 †Gondolella
 †Graeophonus
 †Graeophonus scudderi – type locality for species
 †Greenops
  †Greererpeton
 †Hallopora – tentative report
 †Halysites
 †Harpidium
 †Helenodora – type locality for genus
 †Helenodora inopinata – type locality for species
 †Heliomeroides
 †Holia
 †Hyolithes
 †Ilyodes
 †Isodectes
  †Isotelus
 †Isotelus gigas
 †Isotelus maximus
 †Kionoceras
 †Latzelia – type locality for genus
 †Latzelia primordialis – type locality for species
  †Lepidodendron
 †Lepidodendron aculeatum
 †Lepidophyllum
 †Lepidostrobus
 †Lichas
 †Lingula
 †Liroceras
 Lithophaga – tentative report
  †Lysorophus – type locality for genus
 †Marsupiocrinus
 †Meristina
 †Metacoceras
 †Milosaurus – type locality for genus
 †Monograptus
 †Monograptus dubius
 †Murchisonia
  †Naticopsis
 †Naticopsis carleyana
 †Naticopsis planifrons
 †Naticopsis waterlooensis – type locality for species
 †Nemastomoides – type locality for genus
 †Neospirifer
 †Neospirifer dunbari
 †Neospirifer triplicatus
  †Neuropteris
 †Neuropteris ovata
 †Neuropteris rarinervis
 †Neuropteris scheuchzeri
 †Neuropteris tenuifolia
 †Nodonema
 Nucula
 †Nuculoidea – tentative report
 †Onychopterella – tentative report
 †Palenarthrus – type locality for genus
 †Palenarthrus impressus – type locality for species
 †Paraisobuthus
  †Pecopteris
 †Pecopteris plumosa
 †Pentremites
 †Pentremites tulipaformis
 †Periechocrinus
 †Phacops
  †Phlegethontia
 †Phlegethontia longissima – type locality for species
 †Phragmolites
 †Platyceras
 †Platysomus
 †Platystrophia
 †Plicochonetes
 †Polysentor – type locality for genus
 †Priapulites – type locality for genus
 †Priapulites konecniorum – type locality for species
 †Prodentalium
 †Proetus
  †Protophasma
 †Protopilio
 †Pseudophlegethontia – type locality for genus
 †Pseudophlegethontia turnbullorum – type locality for species
 †Pterochiton
 †Pterotheca
 †Rasstriga – type locality for genus
 †Rasstriga americana – type locality for species
 †Remopleurides
 †Rhodea
  †Rhynchonella
 †Saccoglossus
 †Sagenodus
 †Samaropsis
 †Savagella
 †Scepasma – type locality for genus
  †Sigillaria
 †Silphion – type locality for genus
 † Simplicius
 †Skenidioides
 Solemya
 †Solenochilus
 †Sphaerexochus
 †Sphaerocoryphe
 †Sphenophyllum
 †Sphenophyllum cuneifolium
 †Sphenophyllum emarginatum
 †Sphenophyllum longifolium – or unidentified comparable form
  †Sphenopteris
 †Stearoceras
  †Stethacanthus
 †Stethacanthus altonensis
 †Stigmaria
 †Strophomena
 †Symmorium – type locality for genus
 †Syringopora
 †Tainoceras
 †Tentaculites
 †Tranodis
  †Tullimonstrum – type locality for genus
 †Wilkingia
 †Worthenia
 †Xyloiulus
 Yoldia

Mesozoic

The Paleobiology Database records no known occurrences of Mesozoic fossils in Illinois.

Cenozoic

 Agabus
 †Agabus praelugens – type locality for species
 †Agabus savagei – type locality for species
 †Anomodon – type locality for genus
 †Anomodon snyderi – type locality for species
 †Araloselachus
 †Araloselachus cuspidata
 Arvicola
 †Bananogmius
 †Bananogmius crieleyi – or unidentified comparable form
 Bison
  †Bison antiquus
 †Bison bison
 Blarina
 †Bootherium
 †Bootherium bombifrons
 Carabus
 †Carabus maeander
 Castor
 †Castor canadensis
  †Castoroides
 †Castoroides ohioensis
 †Cervalces
 †Cervalces latifrons – tentative report
  †Cervalces scotti
 Chelonia
 Chlaenius
 †Chlaenius plicatipennis – type locality for species
 Conopeum
 †Conopeum damicornis
 Donacia
 †Donacia stirioides – type locality for species
 Equus
 Esox
  †Euceratherium
 †Euceratherium collinum
 Geomys
 †Geomys bursarius
 †Ischyodus
 †Ischyodus williamsae
 Lasiopodomys
 †Lasiopodomys deceitensis
 †Mammut
 †Mammut americanum
 †Mammuthus
  †Mammuthus primigenius
 Marmota
 †Marmota monax
  †Megalonyx
 †Megalonyx jeffersonii
 Mesalia
 †Mesalia alabamiensis
 Microtus
 †Microtus paroperarius
  Natica
 †Natica reversa
 Olophrum
 †Olophrum henryi – type locality for species
 Ostrea
 †Ostrea pulaskensis
 †Pachyrhizodus
 †Pachyrhizodus caninus
 Patrobus
 †Patrobus henshawi – type locality for species
 Peromyscus
 Pitar – tentative report
 †Pitar ripleyanus
 Pituophis
  †Platygonus – type locality for genus
 †Platygonus compressus – type locality for species
 †Platygonus cumberlandensis – tentative report
 Platynus
 †Platynus calvini – type locality for species
 †Platynus pleistocenicus – type locality for species
 †Platynus subgelidus – type locality for species
 Procyon
 †Procyon lotor – type locality for species
 †Propenser
 †Propenser hewletti
 †Ptychodus
 Rangifer
  †Rangifer tarandus
 †Sangamona
 †Sangamona fugitiva
 Sorex
 †Strepsidura
 †Strepsidura contorea
 Sylvilagus
 †Sylvilagus floridanus
 Ursus
  †Ursus americanus
 Venericardia
 †Venericardia smithii

References
 

Illinois